Agustius also known as Eusepius, was a sixth-century Catholic Bishop of Oloron in France.

Although the sixth century was a formative time for the French state, the historical records of the time are sparse and little is known about his origins, career or his episcopal work. However, according to the La Grande Encyclopédie, he held the see between 551 and 573 AD. He assumed the see following Gratus of Oloron at a time when the Catholic Church in Southern France was facing significant persecution from the Visigoth kings.

See also
Oloron-Sainte-Marie
Ancient Diocese of Oloron

References

Bishops of Oloron
Gallo-Roman saints
5th-century births
6th-century deaths
6th-century bishops in Gaul